The Rearwin Ken-Royce was an American three-seat sport/touring biplane built by Rearwin Airplanes first in Salina, Kansas then Kansas City. It was the first airplane built by the company.

Design and Development
Rae Rearwin had toured Wichita aircraft manufacturers in the summer of 1927 and resolved to start an aircraft manufacturing business. After failing to hire Herb Rawdon away from Travel Air Corporation, he hired a young engineer Rawdon had suggested. Work on the company's first airplane began in an old garage in Salina, Kansas. The airplane, the Ken-Royce, was complete in January 1929. The name was both homage to Rae Rearwin's two sons, and a play on the name Rolls-Royce, implying a quality product.

The first aircraft was finished before a factory or financial backing had been set up. After both were found, further Ken-Royces were built in Kansas City.

The Ken-Royce was a three-seat sport/touring biplane with pilot and passengers seated in tandem. Dual controls were optional, as was the choice of tail skid or tailwheel for the landing gear. Early Ken-Royce's were built with  Curtiss Challenger engines, while Continental Motors' first engine, the  A-70 was substituted after 1930. Production continued until 1937.

Operational history
The prototype Ken-Royce participated in The All-Kansas Air Tour in 1929, an event with both scored events and timed races. The Tour Chairman characterized the Ken-Royce's performance as "unsurpassed." The plane was immediately entered in further races in Memphis and Tulsa.

Ruth Nichols then used the prototype in the Women's Air Derby in 1929. She was forced down outside Wichita because she was unfamiliar with the plane and had emptied the wing fuel tank: but did not realize there was a fuselage tank as well. She was again forced down west of Phoenix when the engine seized. She had to hike for several miles before eventually encountering a car which carried her to a railroad station. She rode to Los Angeles where she recruited a crew to fly another Curtiss Challenger engine out to the desert on a Ford Trimotor to replace the ruined engine. The repair was completed and Nichols flew the Ken-Royce to the starting line 30 minutes before the race started. Nichols and the Ken-Royce advanced to second-place by the time the race reached Columbus. However, on a test flight after adjusting the propeller pitch, the Ken-Royce crashed. It was shipped back to Rearwin by rail.

Ken-Royces were entered in the National Air Races in 1929 and 1930, the Miami Air Races, the Detroit Air Show, and the Pikes Peak Air Meet. One Ken-Royce participated in the Ford National Reliability Air Tour, but took 11th in a field of 18.

The third Ken-Royce biplane was sold to the Dallas School of Aviation, and was delivered by an aviatrix working for the American Eagle company named Jean LaRene. A flight instructor and rated transport pilot, she flew the Ken-Royce in the 1931 and 1932 Women's Air Derby. In 1940, she purchased the plane back from a private owner. Today it is the only Ken-Royce to survive.

Variants
Data from RearwinAirplanes.com

Rearwin 2000/Rearwin 2000-C
The initial version of the Ken-Royce, introduced in 1929. Used the  Curtiss Challenger engine. One prototype and three production built.
Rearwin 2000-CO
Version of the Ken-Royce using the  Continental A-70 engine. One prototype and two production aircraft built.

Operators

 Honduran Air Force - Ordered one Ken-Royce in 1937.

Surviving Aircraft

1 Ken-Royce 2000-C is known to survive. It is owned by the Pioneer Flight Museum, Kingsbury, Texas, and is under restoration.
1 replica, 4/5th scale, was built by Cleo Robinson in Phillipsburg, Kansas and is registered N400KR.

Specifications (Rearwin 2000-C)

References

1920s United States civil utility aircraft
Ken-Royce
High-wing aircraft
Single-engined tractor aircraft
Aircraft first flown in 1929